"Did You Ever Have to Make Up Your Mind?" is a song written by John Sebastian and first released by his band the Lovin' Spoonful on their 1965 debut album Do You Believe in Magic. It was the second single released from the album and the most successful, reaching number 2 on the American Billboard charts for the week of June 11, 1966 (number 1 was "Paint It Black" by the Rolling Stones). It also reached number 2 in Canada. In New Zealand, the song charted at number 5.

Billboard called the song an "easy rockin' ballad" that would be an "off-beat winner for the hot group."  Cash Box described the song as an "easy-going, lyrical blues-tinged item which claims that romantic decisions are extremely difficult to make."

The song has continued to be popular and has been included in many compilations of music of the period. In 1996, Denny's restaurants used the song for their $1.99 breakfasts.

The song aired on an episode of The Wonder Years titled "Cocoa and Sympathy."

In the 1999 film Dudley Do-Right, the song is given a big-band-style arrangement, and it starts with a swing dance battle between Snidely Whiplash and Dudley for Nell Fenwick, and evolves into a big production number. The lead vocals in this version are by Steve Tyrell.

The Christian parody band ApologetiX included a parody, "Did You Ever Ask Where Cain Got His Wife?", on their 2010 album Soundprooof.

Charts

Weekly charts

Year-end charts

Notable covers and later remakes
 The Knack on a 1966 UK single (This was not the "My Sharona" The Knack, this was an earlier British band)
 A sound-alike version in the style of the Lovin' Spoonful's version was used in the 1966 British Antonioni film Blowup. No artist is credited on the soundtrack CD.
 Bud Shank on his 1967 album A Spoonful of Jazz
 Dick Rosmini recorded it for his 1969 album A Genuine Rosmini
 The Good Brothers included it on their 1980 album Best of the Good Brothers: Live
 Curtis Stigers included it on his 2003 album You Inspire Me
 Thao with the Get Down Stay Down on the 2009 Thao/The Thermals Record Store Day Split 7"
 Richard Barone on his 2016 album Sorrows & Promises, featuring John Sebastian on autoharps and harmonica.
 The MonaLisa Twins made a live-action/animated music video with John Sebastian in 2019

References

1965 songs
1966 singles
Songs written by John Sebastian
The Lovin' Spoonful songs
Song recordings produced by Erik Jacobsen
Kama Sutra Records singles